The Fiat 502 is a car produced by Fiat between 1923 and 1926. The 502 was more expensive and bigger variant of the 501. 20,000 were produced.

References
Fiat Personenwagen, Fred Steiningen, 1994. 

502
Cars introduced in 1923